A seismic gap is a segment of an active fault known to produce significant earthquakes that has not slipped in an unusually long time, compared with other segments along the same structure. There is a hypothesis or theory that states that over long periods of time, the displacement on any segment must be equal to that experienced by all the other parts of the fault. Any large and longstanding gap is, therefore, considered to be the fault segment most likely to suffer future earthquakes.

The applicability of this approach has been criticised by some seismologists although earthquakes sometimes have occurred in previously-identified seismic gaps.

Examples

Loma Prieta Seismic Gap, California
Prior to the 1989 Loma Prieta earthquake( = 6.9), that segment of the San Andreas fault system recorded much less seismic activity than other parts of the fault. The main shock and aftershocks of the 1989 event occurred within the previous seismic gap.

Central Kuril gap, Russia
Immediately following the 2004 Indian Ocean earthquake, a seismic gap analysis of the seismic zones around the Pacific Ocean identified the Central Kuril segment of the Kuril–Kamchatka Trench subduction zone as the most likely to give rise to a major earthquake. This zone, 500 km in length, at that time had experienced no major earthquake since 1780, but was bounded to north and south by segments that had moved within the last 100 years. The Mw = 8.3 earthquake of 15 November 2006 and the  = 8.2 earthquake of 13 January 2007 occurred within the defined gap.

Central Himalayan Gap, India
Although there had been earthquakes to the west (near Delhi) in 1905, and to the east (Nepal–Bihar earthquake) in 1934, there was a 600-kilometer-long region of the central Himalayan that had not ruptured since 1505. In April 2015, the 7.8  April 2015 Nepal earthquake occurred near the center of this region.

Cascadia, United States–Canada

The only known damaging earthquakes to have occurred in the Cascadia subduction zone since the 1700 Cascadia earthquake are the 1946 Vancouver Island earthquake and 2001 Nisqually earthquake.

References

External links
USGS glossary entry

Seismology